Edwin Ruthven Holmes (October 1, 1878 – December 10, 1961) was a United States circuit judge of the United States Court of Appeals for the Fifth Circuit and previously was a United States district judge of the United States District Court for the Northern District of Mississippi and the United States District Court for the Southern District of Mississippi.

Education and career

Born in Sidon, Mississippi, Holmes graduated from Millsaps College in 1896 and from the University of Mississippi in 1899. He received a Bachelor of Laws from the University of Texas School of Law in Austin, and was in private practice of law in Yazoo City, Mississippi from 1900 to 1918. He was Mayor of Yazoo City from 1904 to 1908.

Federal judicial service

Holmes was nominated by President Woodrow Wilson on October 17, 1918, to a joint seat on the United States District Court for the Northern District of Mississippi and the United States District Court for the Southern District of Mississippi vacated by Judge Henry Clay Niles. He was confirmed by the United States Senate on October 24, 1918, and received his commission the same day. His service in the Northern District terminated on March 1, 1929, due to his reassignment. His service in the Southern District terminated on April 6, 1936, due to his elevation to the Fifth Circuit.

Holmes was nominated by President Franklin D. Roosevelt on August 23, 1935, to a seat on the United States Court of Appeals for the Fifth Circuit vacated by Judge Nathan Philemon Bryan. He was confirmed by the Senate on March 19, 1936, and received his commission on March 20, 1936. He assumed senior status on November 30, 1954. His service terminated on December 10, 1961, due to his death.

References

Sources
 

1878 births
1961 deaths
Millsaps College alumni
University of Mississippi alumni
Mayors of places in Mississippi
Judges of the United States District Court for the Southern District of Mississippi
Judges of the United States District Court for the Northern District of Mississippi
United States district court judges appointed by Woodrow Wilson
Judges of the United States Court of Appeals for the Fifth Circuit
United States court of appeals judges appointed by Franklin D. Roosevelt
20th-century American judges
People from Sidon, Mississippi
University of Texas alumni
People from Yazoo City, Mississippi